Wilhelm von Essern (1565 – 7 July 1616) was the Prince-Bishop of Worms from 1605 to 1616.  He was appointed bishop on 12 September 1605 and died in office on 7 July 1616.

References

1565 births
1616 deaths
Roman Catholic bishops of Worms